is a railway station in Nunobiki-chō, Chūō-ku, Kobe, Hyōgo Prefecture, and is operated by the West Japan Railway Company (JR West). The station is on the JR Kobe Line which runs between Osaka Station and Himeji Station; part of the Tōkaidō Main Line. As a part of the JR West Urban Network, the following IC cards are accepted: ICOCA, Suica, PiTaPa, TOICA, and SUGOCA.

Sannomiya Station is the main terminal for Kobe and is approximately 2 km east of Kōbe Station. At the beginning of the Meiji period commercial and administrative functions were centred around Kobe Station. However, after Kobe opened as a port for foreign trade, and continuing with the post-World War II reconstruction and expansion of commercial areas, as well as moving Kobe City Hall to the Sannomiya area, the district soon became the new city centre.

Even at the present time, Kobe Station is still the representative station of Kobe. For example, in relation to the calculation of Shinkansen fares, Sannomiya Station is not the closest of the old network train stations. On the other hand, the number of passengers using Sannomiya Station is greater than that of Kobe Station. Also, the Kobe Terminal for highway buses is in front of Sannomiya Station, not Kobe Station. Likewise, there are more limited express trains, including overnight trains, which stop at Sannomiya Station than at Kobe Station.

Station layout

Station placement
Similar to other stations such as Nishinomiya Station, Sannomiya Station is of the island type, with two above-ground platforms which service four tracks. The inner tracks, Nos. 2 and 3, are for all-stations "Local" and "Rapid" trains. The outside tracks, Nos. 1 and 4, are used by "Rapid", "Special Rapid", and "Limited express" trains. Freight trains also pass on these tracks.

Tracks 1 and 4 are capable of accommodating a maximum fifteen-car train, while Tracks 2 and 3 are limited to twelve cars.

The distance to the adjacent Motomachi Station is the shortest anywhere on the JR Kobe Line.

Gates
The station has a total of three ticket gates. Access is via the East, Central and West entrances. The West exit provides direct access to the Hankyu Kobe-sannomiya station, Hanshin Kobe-Sannomiya Station, and Kobe Subway Sannomiya Station.

Ticket office
Sannomiya Station has a  JR Midori no Madoguchi ticket office. It is open everyday from the first train until 23:00.

Platforms

Adjacent stations

Transfer to

JR West
Sanyō Shinkansen: Access to the Shin-Kobe Station is via the Kobe Municipal Subway Seishin-Yamate Line.

All of the lines below, and their representative stations, are adjacent to JR Sannomiya Station, or are in adjoining buildings, or can be accessed by the underground shopping center, Santica (さんちか).
Hankyu Railway (Kobe-Sannomiya Station)
Hankyū Kōbe Line
Kobe Kōsoku Line
Hanshin Electric Railway (Kobe-Sannomiya Station)
Hanshin Main Line
Kobe New Transit
Port Liner
Kobe Municipal Subway
Seishin-Yamate Line
Kaigan Line (Sannomiya-Hanadokeimae Station)

Surrounding area

The area around Sannomiya Station is the largest business and shopping district in Kobe City.

Kobe Shimbun Kaikan (M-INT Kobe)
Sannomiya Bus Terminal (M1 - M11)
JR Sannomiya Terminal Hotel
Bus stops (M12 - M14)
Kobe Central Post Office Sannomiya Station Branch
Shinki Bus Sannomiya Bus Terminal (M15)
Daiei Sannomiya Ekimae
Sogo Kobe
Bus stops (Y1 - Y7)
Sannomiya Chikagai (Santica)
Kobe Kōtsū Center Building
Minato Bank Sannomiya Branch
Airport limousine for Osaka International Airport and Kansai International Airport (S1)
Bus stop (Sannomiyacho Itchome) (S2)
Kobe Marui
Tokyu Hands Sannomiya
Ikuta Shrine
Sannomiya OPA
Kobe City Hall
Mizuho Bank Kobe Branch, Kobe Central Branch
Kobe Mosque, Kobe Islamic Community Center
Sumitomo Mitsui Banking Corporation Sannomiya Branch
The Bank of Tokyo-Mitsubishi UFJ Sannomiya Branch
Sannomiya Center Gai
Bus northbound stops (Hanshin-mae) (S3 - S6)
National Route 2
Hyogo Prefectural Route 21
Flower Road / Hyogo Prefectural Route 30
Bus northbound stops (Subway Sannomiya) (N1 - N3)
Bus southbound stops (Subway Sannomiya) (N4 - N8)

Ridership
On the first day of fiscal year 2005, 115,115 people boarded trains at Sannomiya Station, ranking fourth among JR West stations.

History

11 May 1874: Passenger service begins between Osaka Station and Kobe Station. At the same time, Sannomiya Station opens for passenger service.
1 May 1918: Freight and cargo services moved to Kōbekō Station, and were no longer handled at Sannomiya Station.
10 October 1931: During the change from ground level platforms to overhead platforms, Sannomiya Station was moved from where the current Motomachi Station is to where the station is now.
Sogo and other large businesses were moving to the area around the current Sannomiya Station. That area was being developed to be the new center of the city, so it was decided that a new station would be built in that area.  The new station built was given the name Sannomiya Station. After the relocation, the former station was reopened in 1934 as Motomachi Station.
1 April 1987 - With the breaking up of Japanese National Railways into separate individual business units, Sannomiya Station began operating under the West Japan Railway Company.
17 January 1995: Due to the Great Hanshin earthquake, all traffic ceased.
20 February 1995: Service between Nada Station and Kobe Station resumed. At that point, part of the platform directly above Flower Road remained removed, so passengers were able to use only the Central and East Entrances. The West Entrance reopened at the end of June.
March 2018: Station numbering was introduced with Sannomiya being assigned station number JR-A61.

In the past, Blue Trains (overnight trains with non-sleeper passenger cars) leaving Tokyo Station would stop at Sannomiya Station. However, the last of the Blue Trains that stopped, the Fuji, was merged with the Hayabusa in the route/time-table revision on March 1, 2005, and no longer stops.

Etymology
The name of the area, as well as the station's name, originates from Sannomiya Shrine. Until 1931, Sannomiya Station occupied the place where the modern day Motomachi Station has been established. Motomachi Station is now the closest station to Sannomiya Jinja, however, when the new Sannomiya Station was built, the name went with it.

All of the other transportation facilities in Sannomiya are written in Japanese as 三宮, without the Katakana character "ノ". Only JR includes it in the name, written as 三ノ宮駅. It is thought the reason it was included was to prevent people traveling from other parts of the country from misreading the name. The characters of the station's name can be read many different ways. Now, the difference in the name has actually become helpful to travelers.

In similar fashion, when Nishinomiya Station opened on the same day, the character "ノ" was also displayed in that station's name. However, for many years, the city of Nishinomiya requested the name be changed to match the city's name. On 18 March 2007, in coordination with the opening of Sakura Shukugawa Station, the name was changed. However, in the case of Sannomiya Station, while the cost of changing all of the signage in the city would certainly be costly, it remains that there has been no request or demand for the name to be changed.

Golden Bell Plaza
Near the Central Ticket Gate, is a place with golden bells suspended from the ceiling. This area is called the Golden Bell Plaza. Similar to the Silver Bell Meeting Area at Tōkyō Station, the Golden Bell Plaza is intended to be a familiar place to everyone and a convenient place to meet. The bells were a donation from the Kōbe Central Lions Club.

References

External links

JR West Sannomiya Station (Japanese)

Railway stations in Hyōgo Prefecture
Stations of West Japan Railway Company
Railway stations in Kobe
Railway stations in Japan opened in 1874
Tōkaidō Main Line
JR Kobe Line